The Planning and Development Secretary of Pakistan, also referred to as Secretary P&D, is the Federal Secretary for the Ministry of Planning and Development. The Secretary P&D plays a key role in the country's economic planning and development activity, making it a highly coveted position in the federal government. The position holder is a BPS-22 grade officer, usually belonging to the Pakistan Administrative Service. The Secretary is also a part of the Planning Commission.

See also
Government of Pakistan
Federal Secretary
Interior Secretary of Pakistan
Cabinet Secretary of Pakistan
Finance Secretary of Pakistan
Petroleum Secretary of Pakistan
Ministry of Planning and Development (Pakistan)

References

Ministry of Planning and Development